The Penrose Medal was created in 1925 by R.A.F. Penrose, Jr., as the top prize awarded by the Geological Society of America. Originally created as the Geological Society of America Medal it was soon renamed the Penrose Medal by popular assent of the society's membership, and was first awarded in 1927. It is awarded only at the discretion of the GSA council, "in recognition of eminent research in pure geology, for outstanding original contributions or achievements that mark a major advance in the science of geology."

Award winners

Source: GSA

See also
:Category:Penrose Medal winners
 List of geology awards
 Prizes named after people

References

Geological Society of America
Geology awards

Awards established in 1927
Geology-related lists